Yazan Naim (Arabic:يزن نعيم) (born 5 July 1997) is a Qatari Palestinian footballer. He currently plays as a goalkeeper for Al Ahli SC.

Personal life
Naim was born in Saudi Arabia to Palestinian parents, and moved to Qatar at a young age. He is a youth international for Qatar.

External links

References

1997 births
Living people
Qatari footballers
Palestinian emigrants to Qatar
Qatari people of Palestinian descent
Naturalised citizens of Qatar
Aspire Academy (Qatar) players
Al Ahli SC (Doha) players
Umm Salal SC players
Qatar Stars League players
Association football goalkeepers